Balleyboley may refer to:
Ballyboley (Ballycor), a townland in County Antrim, Northern Ireland
Ballyboley (Larne), a townland in County Antrim, Northern Ireland
Ballyboley, County Down, a townland in County Down, Northern Ireland